Harp Lager is an Irish lager created in 1959. Formerly produced at the Great Northern Brewery in Dundalk, it is now brewed in Dublin. It is a major lager brand throughout most of Northern Ireland, but is now rarely available in the Republic of Ireland.

History

Harp Lager was first produced in 1960 as a bottled beer by the Guinness company (now Diageo), in response to the trend among drinkers in Ireland and Britain towards Continental lager. Guinness converted its Dundalk brewery into a modern lager production plant with the guidance of Dr. Herman Muender, a distinguished German brewer. Various names were considered for the brand, including Atlas, Cresta and Dolphin, before Harp was chosen. The brand was marketed with the Brian Boru harp as its emblem. The Dundalk or Great Northern Brewery soon became the second largest brewery in Ireland while producing Harp during the mid to late 20th century.

By 1961 a consortium of brewers, Courage, Barclay & Simonds, Scottish & Newcastle, Bass, Mitchells & Butlers and Guinness, grouped together as Harp Lager Ltd to brew and market the beer. Courage's Alton Brewery, where Courage Directors had been brewed, was rebuilt to produce the lager in Great Britain.

By 1964, the product was being sold on draught and led in its category for sales. Members of the Harp consortium changed over the years, with Courage and Scottish & Newcastle leaving in 1979, but becoming franchisees. Currently available on draught, and in 330ml and 500ml bottles, its top market is Ulster, especially Northern Ireland and County Donegal as well as in it's original home Dundalk, County Louth where it still maintains a cult status due to the company's once significant role in the community through sponsorship at a number of levels, particularly the Dundalk Maytime Festival and Dundalk FC. In 2005, Harp saw a makeover as Diageo Ireland separated the brand from Guinness.

On 9 May 2008, Diageo Ireland announced that it would close the Dundalk Brewery along with the Kilkenny Brewery over a five-year period. The last Harp was brewed at Great Northern in October 2013, after which production moved to Diageo's sole Irish brewery, St James's Gate Brewery in St. James's Gate, Dublin.

Today, Harp is brewed in the Dublin brewery for Ireland and Hydes Brewery, Salford for Great Britain. In Australia, distribution is handled by Carlton & United Breweries. In North America, Diageo exports from the UK arrive in bottle and cask condition, labeled an "imported from Ireland" lager from St. James Gate, Dublin on its packaging.

Marketing
For many years the slogan "Harp stays sharp"  was used in advertisements. It was written by the advertising executive Rod Allen. Recently it has used the slogan "Look on the Harp side".

References

External links
Diageo
The Harp Club

Diageo beer brands
Beer in Ireland
Irish alcoholic drinks